Kanokon is a 2008 anime based on the light novels written by Katsumi Nishino and illustrated by Koin, published by Media Factory. The series centers on Kouta Oyamada, a young boy from the countryside enrolled in his freshman year at Kunpo High School. He soon becomes the object of affection by Chizuru Minamoto, a second-year student and a fox spirit, and becomes the subject of her perverted actions. He later encounters Nozomu Ezomori, a wolf spirit who also has a romantic interest in Kouta. The series revolves around the love triangle between Kouta, Chizuru, and Nozomu, and the various yōkai who inhabit the school as well as the outside world.

Produced by Xebec, the anime is directed by Atsushi Otsuki, series composition by Masashi Suzuki, music by Tsuyoshi Ito, and characters by Akio Takami. The anime aired on AT-X between April 5, and June 28, 2008, and six DVD volumes were released by Media Factory between June 25 and November 21, 2008. A box set was later released on January 22, 2010. The anime is licensed in North America by Media Blasters under the title Kanokon: The Girl Who Cried Fox, and released the first volume on May 25, 2010. Media Blasters later announced that they will not release volumes 2 and 3 of the series, and instead released a box set on March 22, 2011.

A two-part OVA, was announced, and aired on AT-X between October 4, 2009 and October 11, 2009. Both episodes were released on DVD between November 25 and December 22, 2009 by Media Factory. The OVA is licensed in North America by Media Blasters, who released the series on June 21, 2011.

The anime's opening theme is "Phosphor" sung by Ui Miyazaki, and the ending theme is  sung by Yui Sakakibara.



Episode list

Kanokon (2008)

DVD specials
A series of short special episodes titled "Eizou Tokuten" were packaged with the DVD release of the TV series before 2009. There were a total of thirteen, spread across 6 volumes. Each had two episodes except for the 6th which had 3. Some of them are music videos, others are unseen scenes, the thirteenth is a remix of the events of the last 5 minutes of the 12th episode.

Kanokon: Manatsu no Daishanikusai (2009)

References

External links
Kanokon official website 
Official Xebec Kanokon official website 

Kanokon